Halvor Hansson (4 June 1886 – 1956) was a Norwegian military officer.

During the German occupation of Norway Hansson and Olaf Helset were given the task of performing military evaluation on behalf of Otto Ruge, who was then a prisoner-of-war. Their initiative is regarded as the startup of Milorg, the Norwegian military resistance organization. Hansson was arrested in January 1941. He was promoted Major General in 1945, and served as acting Chief of Defense of Norway in 1946.

His wife since 1915, Øyvor Hansson, turned out to be a Nasjonal Samling and Vidkun Quisling devotee; the couple were divorced.

References 

1886 births
1956 deaths
Military personnel from Oslo
Norwegian Army personnel of World War II
Norwegian Army generals
Norwegian prisoners of war in World War II
World War II prisoners of war held by Germany